Charles Elliott (22 September 1896 – 22 March 1940) was an English professional footballer.

Career
Elliott started his career with Sheffield United and later joined Rotherham Town. He joined Rotherham County in the Second Division in 1921, where he made five appearances and scored one goal during the 1921–22 season, after which he joined York City for their first season in the Midland League in August 1922. He finished his first season with the club as their top scorer with 16 goal and finished his York career with 89 appearances and 27 goals in all competitions.

References

1896 births
Footballers from Sheffield
1940 deaths
English footballers
Association football forwards
Sheffield United F.C. players
Rotherham Town F.C. (1899) players
Rotherham County F.C. players
York City F.C. players
English Football League players
Midland Football League players